The 9 September 2016 Baghdad bombings occurred just before midnight on Friday, 9 September 2016. Twin suicide bombings occurred at the al-Nakheel Mall in Palestine Street, in eastern Baghdad. A car rigged with explosives detonated at the car park of the mall and an assailant blew up his car in a busy street outside shortly afterwards. At least 40 people were killed and 60 wounded. The bombings were later claimed by Islamic State. The Amaq News Agency, which supports Islamic State, said that the bombers targeted "a gathering of Shi'ites".

See also
 American-led intervention in Iraq (2014–present)
 List of terrorist incidents in September 2016
 List of terrorist incidents linked to ISIL
 List of mass car bombings
 Military intervention against ISIL
 Number of terrorist incidents by country
 Timeline of ISIL-related events (2016)
 List of Islamist terrorist attacks
 Timeline of the Iraq War (2016)
 War on Terror

References

2016 murders in Iraq
Suicide bombings in 2016
21st-century mass murder in Iraq
2010s in Baghdad
ISIL terrorist incidents
Islamic terrorist incidents in 2016
Mass murder in Iraq
Mass murder in 2016
September 2016 crimes in Asia
Suicide bombings in Baghdad
Suicide car and truck bombings in Iraq
Terrorist incidents in Baghdad
Terrorist incidents in Iraq in 2016
Attacks on buildings and structures in Iraq
Building bombings in Iraq
Shopping mall bombings